is a Japanese slice of life manga series written and illustrated by Kazuyoshi Takeda. It was serialized in Kodansha's seinen manga magazine Evening from July 2012 to July 2013, with its chapters collected in a single tankōbon volume.

Publication
Sayonara, Tama-chan is written and illustrated by Kazuyoshi Takeda. It was serialized in Kodansha's seinen manga magazine Evening from July 10, 2012, to July 9, 2013. An additional chapter was published in the magazine on August 12, 2013. Kodansha collected the chapters in a single tankōbon volume, released on August 23, 2013.

Reception
It was nominated for the 18th Tezuka Osamu Cultural Prize Reader Award. It was also nominated for the 7th Manga Taishō, receiving 66 points and placing 3rd among the ten nominees.

See also
Peleliu: Guernica of Paradise, another manga series by the same author

References

External links
 

2013 manga
Kodansha manga
Seinen manga
Slice of life anime and manga